Leopold Frederick, Duke of Württemberg-Montbéliard (30 May 1624 in Montbéliard – 15 June 1662 in Montbéliard) was a son of Duke Louis Frederick and his first wife, Elisabeth Magdalena of Hesse-Darmstadt.  He succeeded his father in 1631.

He married Sibylle, the youngest daughter of Duke John Frederick of Württemberg.  The marriage remained childless.

He died in 1662 and was succeeded by his half-brother George II.

1624 births
1662 deaths
17th-century dukes of Württemberg
Counts of Montbéliard